Vail is a city in Crawford County, Iowa, United States. The population was 396 at the time of the 2020 census.

History
Vail was laid out in 1871, and incorporated in 1875. The city was named for C. E. Vail, a relative of railroad magnate John Insley Blair.

Geography
Vail is located at  (42.061061, -95.202423).

Demographics

2010 census
As of the census of 2010, there were 436 people, 174 households, and 120 families living in the city. The racial makeup of the city was 89.2% White, 0.7% African American, 0.9% Native American, 8.9% from other races, and 0.2% from two or more races. Hispanic or Latino of any race were 12.4% of the population.

There were 174 households, of which 35.1% had children under the age of 18 living with them, 55.2% were married couples living together, 8.6% had a female householder with no husband present, 5.2% had a male householder with no wife present, and 31.0% were non-families. 27.6% of all households were made up of individuals, and 15% had someone living alone who was 65 years of age or older. The average household size was 2.51 and the average family size was 3.00.

The median age in the city was 42.3 years. 27.3% of residents were under the age of 18; 6.1% were between the ages of 18 and 24; 20.3% were from 25 to 44; 31.2% were from 45 to 64; and 15.1% were 65 years of age or older. The gender makeup of the city was 47.0% male and 53.0% female.

2000 census
As of the census of 2000, there were 452 people, 185 households, and 128 families living in the city. The racial makeup of the city was 97.57% White, 0.88% African American, 0.22% Asian, 1.33% from other races. Hispanic or Latino of any race were 1.77% of the population.

There were 185 households, out of which 35.7% had children under the age of 18 living with them, 53.0% were married couples living together, 9.2% had a female householder with no husband present, and 30.8% were non-families. 28.1% of all households were made up of individuals, and 15.7% had someone living alone who was 65 years of age or older. The average household size was 2.44 and the average family size was 2.95.

28.1% are under the age of 18, 7.1% from 18 to 24, 25.4% from 25 to 44, 21.5% from 45 to 64, and 17.9% who were 65 years of age or older. The median age was 37 years. For every 100 females, there were 100.0 males. For every 100 females age 18 and over, there were 100.6 males.

The median income for a household in the city was $33,750, and the median income for a family was $39,107. Males had a median income of $24,500 versus $19,063 for females. The per capita income for the city was $15,071. About 6.2% of families and 7.0% of the population were below the poverty line, including 7.8% of those under age 18 and 12.5% of those age 65 or over.

Education
The Ar-We-Va Community School District operates local area schools.

Notable person

 SSgt. William 'Billy Jack' Dieter, bombardier on crew #6 on the Doolittle Raid

See also
 List of cities in Nebraska

References

External links

Cities in Crawford County, Iowa
Cities in Iowa